Alberto Villalón Morales (Santiago de Cuba, 7 June 1882 – Havana, 16 July 1955) was one of the greatest musicians in the Cuban trova style.

He was the only one of the 'four greats' of the trova to come from a well-to-do family. Villalón and his sister América studied guitar with Pepe Sánchez, the father of the trova movement. Later, he studied classical guitar to achieve a really excellent technique. He composed his first canciones and boleros at fourteen, and moved to Havana in 1900. In 1907 he recorded on Edison cylinders. In 1908 he formed the Cuarteto Villalón with Adolfo Colombo (tenor), Claudio García (baritone), Emilio Reinoso (mandolin), and Alberto Villalón (guitar). Colombo and García were regular members of the Teatro Alhambra company; Colombo was the most recorded singer of the age.

A difference between Villalón and the other early trovadors was in his guitar technique. With his training he preferred picking (punteado) instead of strumming (rasgueado), which had been the main technique previously. This gave him a wider range of harmonic possibilities and a characteristic style. He had a second career in 1927 when he became a founding member of the Septeto Nacional de Ignacio Piñeiro. Alberto brought into the septet Juan de la Cruz and Benvenido León, who had been playing with him in a trio. The addition of the first really great sonero, Abelardo Barroso (1905 – 1972), made the Nacional the best group in Cuba for its time.

Villalón's career, then, connected the world of trova with the world of son which became central to Cuba's popular music for the rest of the century.

References 

Hermanas Martí: Música de Alberto Villalón. EGREM LDA–3189

External links
 Alberto Villalón Morales recordings at the Discography of American Historical Recordings.

1882 births
1955 deaths
Cuban male singer-songwriters
Cuban guitarists
Cuban male guitarists
People from Santiago de Cuba
Musicians from Havana
20th-century Cuban male singers
20th-century guitarists